The Whip is a melodrama by Henry Hamilton and Cecil Raleigh, first performed in 1909 at the Drury Lane Theatre in London.  The play's original production had intricate scenery and spectacular stage effects, including a horse race and a train crash.  There were later productions in the United States and Australia, and the play inspired two silent films.

Reception
Tallulah Bankhead offers a reminiscence of attending The Whip at the Manhattan Opera House as a child:

The heroine, "Lady Di" Sartoris, created by Jessie Bateman, was referenced in P. G. Wodehouse's Heavy Weather (1933).

Adaptations
A novelization by Richard Parker was published in 1913. The play was adapted into films of the same name in 1917 and  again in 1928.

Sources

References

External links

Photographs of the stage settings for The Whip

British plays
1909 plays